Butane-1,4-diol, not to be confused with 1,3 butanediol, is a primary alcohol, and an organic compound, with the formula HOCH2CH2CH2CH2OH. It is a colorless viscous liquid. It is one of four stable isomers of butanediol.

Synthesis
In industrial chemical synthesis, acetylene reacts with two equivalents of formaldehyde to form butyne-1,4-diol. Hydrogenation of butyne-1,4-diol gives butane-1,4-diol. It is also made on an industrial scale from maleic anhydride in the Davy process, which is first converted to the methyl maleate ester, then hydrogenated. Other routes are from butadiene, allyl acetate and succinic acid.

A biological route to BD has been commercialized that uses a genetically modified organism.  The biosynthesis proceeds via 4-hydroxybutyrate.

Industrial use
Butane-1,4-diol is used industrially as a solvent and in the manufacture of some types of plastics, elastic fibers and polyurethanes.  In organic chemistry, 1,4-butanediol is used for the synthesis of γ-butyrolactone (GBL). In the presence of phosphoric acid and high temperature, it dehydrates to the important solvent tetrahydrofuran. At about 200 °C in the presence of soluble ruthenium catalysts, the diol undergoes dehydrogenation to form butyrolactone. It is used to synthesize 1,4-Butanediol diglycidyl ether which is then used as a reactive diluent for epoxy resins.

World production of butane-1,4-diol was claimed to be about one million metric tons per year and market price is about  2,000 (€ 1,600) per ton (2005). In 2013, worldwide production was claimed to be billions of lbs (consistent with approximately one million metric tons).

Almost half of it is dehydrated to tetrahydrofuran to make fibers such as Spandex. The largest producer is BASF.

Use as a recreational drug

Butane-1,4-diol is also used as a recreational drug known by some users as "One Comma Four", "Liquid Fantasy", "One Four Bee" or "One Four B-D-O". A few Federal Courts have stated that 1,4-butanediol exerts effects similar to gamma-hydroxybutyrate (GHB), which is a metabolic product of 1,4-butanediol. But other Federal courts have ruled that it is not.

Pharmacokinetics
Butane-1,4-diol is rapidly converted into gamma-hydroxybutyric acid by the enzymes alcohol dehydrogenase and aldehyde dehydrogenase, and differing levels of these enzymes may account for differences in effects and side effects between users. While co-administration of ethanol and GHB already poses serious risks, co-administration of ethanol with 1,4-butanediol will interact considerably and has many other potential risks. This is because the same enzymes that are responsible for metabolizing alcohol also metabolize 1,4-butanediol so there is a strong chance of a dangerous drug interaction. Emergency room patients who overdose on both ethanol and 1,4-butanediol often present with symptoms of alcohol intoxication initially and as the ethanol is metabolized the 1,4-butanediol is then able to better compete for the enzyme and a second period of intoxication ensues as the 1,4-butanediol is converted into GHB.

Pharmacodynamics
Butane-1,4-diol seems to have two types of pharmacological actions. The major psychoactive effects of 1,4-butanediol are because it is metabolized into GHB; however there is a study suggesting that 1,4-butanediol may have potential alcohol-like pharmacological effects on its own. The study arrived at this conclusion based on the finding that butane-1,4-diol coadministered with ethanol led to potentiation of some of the behavioral effects of ethanol. However, potentiation of ethanol's effects may simply be caused by competition for the alcohol dehydrogenase and aldehyde dehydrogenase enzymes with co-administered 1,4-butanediol. The shared metabolic rate-limiting steps thus leads to slowed metabolism and clearance for both compounds including ethanol's known toxic metabolite acetaldehyde.

Another study found no effect following intracerebroventricular injection of butane-1,4-diol in rats. This contradicts the hypothesis of butane-1,4-diol having inherent alcohol-like pharmacological effects.

Like gamma-hydroxybutyric acid, butane-1,4-diol is safe only in small amounts. Adverse effects in higher doses include nausea, vomiting, dizziness, sedation, vertigo, and potentially death if ingested in large amounts. Anxiolytic effects are diminished and side effects increased when used in combination with alcohol.

Legality
While butane-1,4-diol is not currently scheduled federally in the United States, a number of states have classified 1,4-butanediol as a controlled substance.  Individuals have been prosecuted for possession of 1,4-butanediol  under the Federal Analog Act as substantially similar to GHB. A federal case in New York in 2002 ruled that 1,4-butanediol could not be considered an analog of GHB under federal law, but that decision was later overturned by the Second Circuit. A jury in Federal District Court in Chicago found that 1,4-butanediol was not an analog of GHB under federal law, which was not disputed on the case's appeal to the Seventh Circuit Court of Appeals, however this finding did not affect the outcome of the case.  In the United Kingdom, 1,4-butanediol was scheduled in December 2009 (along with another GHB precursor, gamma-butyrolactone) as a Class C controlled substance. In Germany, the drug is not explicitly illegal, but might also be treated as illegal if used as a drug. It is controlled as a Schedule VI precursor in Canada.

2007 contamination of Bindeez toy

A toy called "Bindeez" ("Aqua Dots" in North America) was recalled by the distributor in November 2007 because of the presence of butane-1,4-diol. The toy consists of small beads that stick to each other by sprinkling water. Butane-1,4-diol was detected by GC-MS. The production plant seems to have intended to cut costs by replacing less toxic pentane-1,5-diol with butane-1,4-diol. ChemNet China listed the price of butane-1,4-diol at between about US$1,350–2,800 per metric ton, while the price for 1,5-pentanediol is about US$9,700 per metric ton.

2021 poisoning at Darmstadt Technical University
In August 2021, several people fell severely ill after consuming drinks at building L2.01 at the Lichtwiese Campus of Darmstadt Technical University, Germany. Seven showed severe symptoms, two were transported to a hospital in Frankfurt am Main, and a 30-year-old person was, for a time, in a critical state. Butane-1,4-diol had been detected in milk packages, as well as in water filters. At the location, detectives also found bromophenols and dicyclohexylamine.

See also
 1,4-Butanediol diglycidyl ether

References

External links 
 
 
 Record in the Household Products Database of NLM

Alcohol solvents
Prodrugs
Sedatives
Alkanediols
GABAB receptor agonists
GHB receptor agonists
Designer drugs
GABA analogues
Primary alcohols
1,4-Butanediyl compounds